Skorpa may refer to:

Places
 Skorpa (Hol), a mountain in Hol municipality, Buskerud county
 Skorpa, Kristiansund, an island in Kristiansund municipality, Møre og Romsdal county
 Skorpa, Møre og Romsdal, an uninhabited island in Herøy municipality, Møre og Romsdal county

 Skorpa, Kinn, an island in Flora municipality, Sogn og Fjordane county
 Skorpa, Troms, an island in Kvænangen municipality, Troms county
 Skorpa prisoner of war camp, a World War II POW camp on Skorpa island in Troms county

 Skorpa Bird Sanctuary, a bird sanctuary in Svalbard, Norway

Other uses
 a Swedish form of rusk